Deng Hua (28 April 1910 – 3 July 1980) was a general in the Chinese People's Liberation Army. He was the Deputy Commander of the People's Volunteer Army. After Marshal Peng Dehuai returned to China for medical treatment, Deng Hua became the Acting Commander and Political Commissar.

Early life and military career
Deng Hua was born in Hunan Province in 1910.He joined the Chinese Communist Party in March 1927. In February 1928, he participated in the Xiangnan Uprising led by Zhu De and Chen Yi, and served as an officer in the 7th Division of the Chinese Red Army. After taking part in the Long March and arriving in northern Shaanxi, he studied at the Red Army School (Counter-Japanese Military and Political University)  then served as Director of the Political Department of the Second Division of the Red Army and the Political Commissar of the First Division of the Red Army.

During the Second Sino-Japanese War, he served as political commissar of the First Division and commander of the Fifth Division, among others. In the Chinese Civil War, he initially served as Deputy Commander Northeast and was later active in capturing Guangdong and Hainan.

In addition to his military career, he was also a graduate of the Central Party School of the Chinese Communist Party.

Korean War
In 1950, Deng Hua became the First Deputy Commander of the Chinese People's Volunteer Army and was the main assistant of Marshal Peng Dehuai. In July 1951, he was involved in the military negotiations to stop the war, and after the failure of the negotiations, he proposed changes to the Sixth Campaign Plan, a proposal that was adopted by Chairman Mao Zedong. When the American-led UN forces launched the "Autumn Offensive", Deng commanded the Volunteers to win a major victory. After Peng Dehuai returned to China in 1952, he served as the commander and political commissar of the PVA, and commanded the counterattack in the fall of 1952, that led to the signing of the Korean Armistice Agreement in 1953.

Later years
After returning to China in April 1954, Deng became the Commander of the Shenyang Military Region, until 1959. In September 1956, at the Eighth National Congress of the CPC, he was elected a member of the Central Committee of the Chinese Communist Party. In the same year, he visited Yugoslavia and Bulgaria as part of an official Chinese delegation.

In 1959 he was removed from the PLA as a close associate of Peng Dehuai and was later persecuted during the Cultural Revolution. However, in 1977, after the end of the Cultural Revolution, Deng was completely rehabilitated and restored to his military rank, and also became Vice President of the Chinese Academy of Sciences.

He died in Shanghai on July 3, 1980, at the age of 70. In his official obituary the CPC Central Committee praised him highly: "Comrade Deng Hua was loyal to the party and loyal to the people, adhering to the Party's correct line. He was an outstanding member of our party, an excellent military commander and political worker".

References

People's Liberation Army generals from Hunan
Chinese military personnel of the Korean War
1910 births
1980 deaths
Chinese Red Army generals
Victims of the Cultural Revolution
Politicians from Chenzhou
People's Republic of China politicians from Hunan
Chinese Communist Party politicians from Hunan
Commanders of the Shenyang Military Region